Lauro Pacussich (born 16 August 1940) is a Peruvian rower. He competed in the men's coxed pair event at the 1968 Summer Olympics.

References

1940 births
Living people
Peruvian male rowers
Olympic rowers of Peru
Rowers at the 1968 Summer Olympics
Sportspeople from Lima